Jayanta Nath (born 20 May 1964) is an Indian singer, composer, music director, film director from Jorhat, Assam. His contributions are mostly in Assamese music, Assamese film industry and Mobile theatre of Assam. He has composed more than five hundred songs in Assamese and other regional languages

Discography

Albums

Extended plays

Singles

Public Performances 
Jayanta Nath had performed in various stages across Assam during the period of Bihu. He was invited by the Assam Society, UAE to perform on Rongali Bihu celebration in 2006, along with actor Jatin Bora. In the year 2010, he was invited again to be a part of this celebration.

Movies

References

External links 

 Official Website

Living people
Assamese-language singers
Assamese-language film directors
Indian male pop singers
Film directors from Assam
Singers from Assam
People from Jorhat district
1964 births